Samak (also Romanized as Samk; also known as Sanmak, Sīmak, and Simorgh) is a village in Arabkhaneh Rural District, Shusef District, Nehbandan County, South Khorasan Province, Iran. At the 2006 census, its population was 143, in 44 families.

References 

Populated places in Nehbandan County